Players and pairs who neither have high enough rankings nor receive wild cards may participate in a qualifying tournament held one week before the annual Wimbledon Tennis Championships.

Seeds

  Laura Pous Tió (second round)
  Stéphanie Cohen-Aloro (second round)
  Lindsay Lee-Waters (first round)
  Marie-Ève Pelletier (second round)
  Jamea Jackson (qualified)
  Ekaterina Bychkova (first round)
  Eva Birnerová (qualifying competition, lucky loser)
  Camille Pin (first round)
  Séverine Beltrame (qualifying competition, lucky loser)
  Sandra Klösel (first round)
  Sandra Kleinová (first round)
  Anastasiya Yakimova (second round)
  Galina Voskoboeva (first round)
  Mara Santangelo (qualified)
  Tzipora Obziler (second round)
  Chanda Rubin (withdrew)
  Edina Gallovits (second round)
  Emma Laine (first round)
  Melinda Czink (qualifying competition, lucky loser)
  Tsvetana Pironkova (qualifying competition)
  Yvonne Meusburger (second round)
  Shikha Uberoi (second round)
  Hana Šromová (first round)
  Maria Fernanda Alves (first round)

Qualifiers

  Kateřina Böhmová
  Sofia Arvidsson
  Ashley Harkleroad
  Els Callens
  Jamea Jackson
  Meilen Tu
  Saori Obata
  Mara Santangelo
  Sabine Klaschka
  Kateryna Bondarenko
  Julia Vakulenko
  Tatiana Poutchek

Lucky losers

  Eva Birnerová
  Séverine Beltrame
  Melinda Czink

Qualifying draw

First qualifier

Second qualifier

Third qualifier

Fourth qualifier

Fifth qualifier

Sixth qualifier

Seventh qualifier

Eighth qualifier

Ninth qualifier

Tenth qualifier

Eleventh qualifier

Twelfth qualifier

External links

2005 Wimbledon Championships on WTAtennis.com
2005 Wimbledon Championships – Women's draws and results at the International Tennis Federation

Women's Singles Qualifying
Wimbledon Championship by year – Women's singles qualifying
Wimbledon Championships